RK Sisak is a Croatian rugby club in Sisak.

History
The club was founded on 15 February 1970 as RK Student by a couple of university students.

External links
 RK Sisak

Croatian rugby union teams
Rugby clubs established in 1970
1970 establishments in Croatia
Sport in Sisak